204 (Tyneside Scottish) Battery Royal Artillery is part of 101st (Northumbrian) Regiment Royal Artillery, an artillery regiment of the British Army.

History
In 1967, 101 (Northumbrian) Medium Regiment RA (V) was formed. 204 Medium Battery was initially equipped with the BL 5.5-inch Medium Gun and based in Gosforth; the battery took on its Tyneside Scottish designation in 1974 and then converted to the 105mm Light Gun when it moved to Walker in 1981. After briefly converting to the FH-70 Howitzer in 1993 and moving to Kingston Park in 1994, the battery took on a support role providing elements to HQ 1 Artillery Brigade in 1998 and  then converted to a Surveillance and Target Acquisition role in 2004. Under Army 2020, it will re-role to the M270 Multiple Launch Rocket System.

References

Publications
 Litchfield, Norman E H, 1992. The Territorial Artillery 1908-1988, The Sherwood Press, Nottingham. 

Royal Artillery batteries